is a paralympic athlete from Japan competing mainly in category T54 wheelchair racing events.

Kazu competed in the 400m, 800m and marathon at the 1992 Summer Paralympics without any medal success.  But in 1996 she won a bronze medal in the 5000m and a silver in the 10000m and marathon as well as competing in the 400m and 800m.  The 2000 Summer Paralympics would see her repeat that silver in the marathon while also competing in the 5000m.  Doing the same two events in the 2008 Summer Paralympics led to Kazu's first gold medal in the marathon.

References

Year of birth missing (living people)
Living people
Japanese female wheelchair racers
Paralympic wheelchair racers
Paralympic athletes of Japan
Athletes (track and field) at the 1992 Summer Paralympics
Athletes (track and field) at the 1996 Summer Paralympics
Athletes (track and field) at the 2000 Summer Paralympics
Athletes (track and field) at the 2004 Summer Paralympics
Paralympic gold medalists for Japan
Paralympic silver medalists for Japan
Paralympic bronze medalists for Japan
Medalists at the 1996 Summer Paralympics
Medalists at the 2000 Summer Paralympics
Medalists at the 2004 Summer Paralympics
Paralympic medalists in athletics (track and field)
20th-century Japanese women
21st-century Japanese women